Myanmar (also known as Burma) operates de jure as a unitary assembly-independent republic under its 2008 constitution. On 1 February 2021, Myanmar's military took over the government in a coup, causing ongoing anti-coup protests.

Political conditions

Early histrory 
The history of Myanmar, formerly called Burma, began with the Pagan Kingdom in 849. Although each kingdom has constantly been at war with their neighbors, it was the largest South East Asian Empire during the 16th century under the Taungoo Dynasty. The thousand-year line of Burmese monarchy ended with the Third Anglo-Burmese War in 1885.

British rule 
After 1885, the country was administered as part of British India until 1937. British Burma began with its official recognition on the colonial map that marks its new borders containing over 100 ethnicities. It was named Burma after the dominant ethnic group Bamar, who make up 68 percent of the population.

World War II 
During World War II, a coalition of mostly members of the Bamar ethnic group volunteered to fight alongside the Japanese in hope of overthrowing the occupying British forces. Meanwhile, many other ethnic groups supported the Allied forces against the Bamar-backed Japanese forces. This conflict would come to be very significant in the aftermath of World War II when Burma was granted its independence from Great Britain in 1948. Prior to the end of their colonization, the British government had created a novel map of the country with new borders that included some previously sovereign ethnicities. Many groups of racially and culturally diverse people suddenly found themselves as part of a country that was named after the Bamar, a group they did not identify with. The division created during World War II only exacerbated the growing resentment towards the Bamar. By granting independence to Burma, the British government handed the control of all the containing ethnicities over to the Bamar.

Panglong Agreement 
Aung San, who led the fight for independence, was able to convince the leaders of the other ethnic groups that fought alongside the Burmese to remain as one country. The formation of the new Burmese constitution in 1948 was cemented by the Pin-Lone agreement, which was signed by every ethnic leader in support of the newfound union. Aung San's unprecedented assassination prior to the absolute fulfillment of the Pin-Lone agreement undid the unification he led. His death marked the short lived period of peace within the new nation, unleashing a power vacuum that has not been filled properly since. A period of instability with leaders that failed to represent every ethnicity's best interest followed.

Socialist republic 
Democracy was suspended in the country following a coup in 1962. The uncertainty and chaos paved the way for a Burmese nationalist government to take over. From 1962 to 1988, the country was ruled by the Burma Socialist Programme Party as a one-party state guided by the Burmese Way to Socialism. The new Burmese leaders turned Burma into a Socialist Republic with isolationism, and a Burmese superiority. The newfound Burmese nationalism put the Bamar majority at the forefront, undoing the unification initiated through the Pin-Lone agreement. Additionally, the growing disdain was enhanced through the forced coexistence between members of different religions. Bamar kingdoms were almost exclusively Buddhist in the past. Most ethnic groups within the Shan, Kayin, Kayar, and Chin state practiced their own versions of Animism, while people of the Islamic faith lived alongside the Buddhists in the Arakan (now Rakhine) state. The annexation of all the diverse groups into the British India deepened the religious polarization. The movement of people across the border caused by the colonization added a large group of Hindu followers to the mix. The strenuous conversion campaigns by the Catholic Christians and their competition with the Methodist colonialists additionally divided minority groups such as the Karen and Kachin within themselves. The colonial departure unleashed the animosity that has been building towards one other. The death of Aung San, and the following leaderships ensured the lasting conflicts between every cultural and religious group. The 1988 Uprising cemented the social, political, and civil unrests that have plagued the country since.

8888 Uprising 
The SPDC junta which took power in 1988 had been responsible for the displacement of several hundred thousand citizens, both inside and outside of Burma. The Karen, Karenni, and Mon ethnic groups have sought asylum in neighbouring Thailand, where they are also abused by an unfriendly and unsympathetic government. These groups are perhaps more fortunate than the Wa and Shan ethnic groups, who have become internally displaced peoples in their own state since being removed from lands by the military junta in 2000. There are reportedly 600,000 of these internally displaced peoples living in Burma today. Many are trying to escape forced labour in the military or for one of the many state-sponsored drug cartels. This displacement of peoples has led to both human rights violations as well as the exploitation of minority ethnic groups at the hands of the dominant Bamar group. The primary actors in these ethnic struggles include, but are not limited to, the military, the Karen National Union and the Mong Tai Army.

The military gave up some of its power in 2011, leading to the creation of a semi-democratic system, although problems remained, including outsized influence by the military under the 2008 constitution, as well as economic and ethnic issues.

2021 Myanmar coup d'état 
On 31 January 2021, it was reported by multiple media and news outlets that the military had staged a coup and arrested members of the governing party, National League for Democracy, had been arrested and detained by the military. Spokesman for the NLD, Myo Nyunt said "[t]he military seems to take control of the capital now." These conflicts arose after the NLD had claimed victory after a successful election in November 2020. While the military contested the results of the election claiming fraudulent without any proof or investigation. This situation was followed by the military performing coup d'état on 1 February 2021, taking the presidential powers from the NLD government by brute force.

History

Independence era 
On 4 January 1948, Burma achieved independence from Britain, and became a democracy based on the parliamentary system.

In late 1946 Aung San became Deputy Chairman of the Executive Council of Burma, a transitional government. But on 19 July 1947, political rivals assassinated Aung San and several cabinet members. On 4 January 1948, the nation became an independent republic, named the Union of Burma, with Sao Shwe Thaik as its first president and U Nu as its first prime minister. Unlike almost all other former British colonies, it did not become a member of the Commonwealth. A bicameral parliament was formed, consisting of a Chamber of Deputies and a Chamber of Nationalities. The geographical area Burma encompasses today can be traced to the Panglong Agreement, which combined Burma proper, which consisted of Lower Burma and Upper Burma, and the Frontier Areas, which had been administered separately by the British.

AFPFL/Union government 
In 1961, U Thant, Burma's Permanent Representative to the United Nations and former secretary to the Prime Minister, was elected Secretary-General of the United Nations; he was the first non-Westerner to head any international organisation and would serve as UN Secretary-General for ten years. Among the Burmese to work at the UN when he was Secretary-General was a young Aung San Suu Kyi.

Military socialist era 
In 1962, General Ne Win led a coup d'état and established a nominally socialist military government that sought to follow the "Burmese Way to Socialism". The military expropriated private businesses and followed an economic policy of autarky, or economic isolation.

There were sporadic protests against military rule during the Ne Win years and these were almost always violently suppressed. On 7 July 1962, the government broke up demonstrations at Rangoon University, killing 15 students. In 1974, the military violently suppressed anti-government protests at the funeral of U Thant. Student protests in 1975, 1976 and 1977 were quickly suppressed by overwhelming force. The government was deposed following the 1988 Uprising, but was replaced by a military junta.

SPDC era 
The former head of state was Senior General Than Shwe who held the title of "Chairman of the State Peace and Development Council". His appointed prime minister was Khin Nyunt until 19 October 2004, when he was forcibly deposed in favour of Gen. Soe Win. Almost all cabinet offices are held by military officers.

US and European government sanctions against the military government, combined with consumer boycotts and shareholder pressure organised by Free Burma activists, have succeeded in forcing most western corporations to withdraw from Burma. However, some western oil companies remain due to loopholes in the sanctions. For example, the French oil company TotalEnergies and the American oil company Chevron continue to operate the Yadana natural gas pipeline from Burma to Thailand. TotalEnergies (formerly TotalFinaElf) is the subject of a lawsuit in French and Belgian courts for alleged complicity in human rights abuses along the gas pipeline. Before it was acquired by Chevron, Unocal settled a similar lawsuit for a reported multimillion-dollar amount. Asian businesses, such as Daewoo, continue to invest in Burma, particularly in natural resource extraction.

The United States and European clothing and shoe industry became the target of Free Burma activists for buying from factories in Burma that were wholly or partly owned by the government or the military. Many stopped sourcing from Burma after protests, starting with Levi Strauss in 1992. From 1992 to 2003, Free Burma activists successfully forced dozens of clothing and shoe companies to stop sourcing from Burma. These companies included Eddie Bauer, Liz Claiborne, Macy's, J. Crew, JoS. A. Banks, Children's Place, Burlington Coat Factory, Wal-Mart, and Target. The US government banned all imports from Burma as part of the "Burmese Freedom and Democracy Act" of 2003. Sanctions have been criticised for their adverse effects on the civilian population. However, Burmese democracy movement leader Aung San Suu Kyi has repeatedly credited sanctions for putting pressure on the ruling military regime.

Human Rights Watch and Amnesty International have documented egregious human rights abuses by the military government. Civil liberties are severely restricted. Human Rights Defenders and Promoters, formed in 2002 to raise awareness among the people of Burma about their human rights, claims that on 18 April 2007, several of its members were met by approximately a hundred people led by a local USDA Secretary U Nyunt Oo and beaten up. The HRDP believes that this attack was condoned by the authorities.

There is no independent judiciary in Burma and the military government suppresses political activity. The government uses software-based filtering from US company Fortinet to limit the materials citizens can access on-line, including free email services, free web hosting and most political opposition and pro-democracy pages.

In 2001, the government permitted NLD office branches to re-open throughout Burma. However, they were shut down or heavily restricted beginning 2004, as part of a government campaign to prohibit such activities. In 2006, many members resigned from NLD, citing harassment and pressure from the Tatmadaw (Armed Forces) and the Union Solidarity and Development Association.

The military government placed Aung San Suu Kyi under house arrest again on 31 May 2003, following an attack on her convoy in northern Burma by a mob reported to be in league with the military. The regime extended her house arrest for yet another year in late November 2005. Despite a direct appeal by Kofi Annan to Than Shwe and pressure from ASEAN, the Burmese government extended Aung San Suu Kyi's house arrest another year on 27 May 2006. She was released in 2010.

The United Nations urged the country to move towards inclusive national reconciliation, the restoration of democracy, and full respect for human rights. In December 2008, the United Nations General Assembly passed a resolution condemning the human rights situation in Burma and calling for Aug San Suu Kyi's release—80 countries voting for the resolution, 25 against and 45 abstentions. Other nations, such as China and Russia, have been less critical of the regime and prefer to co-operate on economic matters.

Facing increasing international isolation, Burma's military government agreed to embark upon a programme of reform, including permitting multiple political parties to contest elections in 2010 and 2012 and the release of political prisoners. However, organizations such as Human Rights Watch allege continued human rights abuses in ongoing conflicts in border regions such as Kachin State and Rakhine State.

New constitution 
Myanmar's army-drafted constitution was overwhelmingly approved (by 92.4% of the 22 million voters with alleged voter turnout of 99%) on 10 May 2008 in the first phase of a two-stage referendum and Cyclone Nargis. It was the first national vote since the 1990 election. Multi-party elections in 2010 would end 5 decades of military rule, as the new charter gives the military an automatic 25% of seats in parliament. NLD spokesman Nyan Win, inter alia, criticised the referendum: "This referendum was full of cheating and fraud across the country. In some villages, authorities and polling station officials ticked the ballots themselves and did not let the voters do anything".

2010 election

An election was held in 2010, with 40 parties approved to contest the elections by the Electoral Commission. some of which are linked to ethnic minorities. The National League for Democracy, which overwhelmingly won the previous 1990 elections but were never allowed to take power, decided not to participate.

The military-backed Union Solidarity and Development Party declared victory, winning 259 of the 330 contested seats. The United Nations and many Western countries have condemned the elections as fraudulent, although the decision to hold elections was praised by China and Russia.

2012 by-elections

In by-elections held in 2012, the main opposition party National League for Democracy, which was only re-registered for the by-elections on 13 December 2011 won in 43 of the 44 seats they contested (out of 46). Significantly, international observers were invited to monitor the elections, although the government was criticised for placing too many restrictions on election monitors, some of whom were denied visas.

The Union Solidarity and Development Party said it would lodge official complaints to the Union Election Commission on poll irregularities, voter intimidation, and purported campaign incidents that involved National League for Democracy members and supporters, while the National League for Democracy also sent an official complaint to the commission, regarding ballots that had been tampered with.

However, President Thein Sein remarked that the by-elections were conducted "in a very successful manner", and many foreign countries have indicated willingness to lift or loosen sanctions on Burma and its military leaders.

2015 election

Myanmar general elections were held on 8 November 2015. These were the first openly contested elections held in Myanmar since 1990. The results gave the National League for Democracy an absolute majority of seats in both chambers of the national parliament, enough to ensure that its candidate would become president, while NLD leader Aung San Suu Kyi is constitutionally barred from the presidency.

The resounding victory of Aung San Suu Kyi's National League for Democracy in 2015 general elections raised hopes for a successful political transition from a closely held military rule to a free democratic system. This transition was widely believed to be determining the future of Myanmar.

According to the results announced by the Union Election Commission on 13 November 2015, the NLD won 238 seats in the lower house and 348 seats in the Pyidaungsu Hluttaw, exceeding the required number to form a government and elect a president.

2021 military coup and subsequent junta 

The Tatmadaw, under the leadership of Min Aung Hlaing, seized power from the civilian government after detaining Aung San Suu Kyi and other democratically elected leaders in Naypyidaw. A military junta, officially the State Administration Council was subsequently established.

Heads and deputy heads

Cabinet members

Executive branch

|ChairmanPrime Minister
|Min Aung Hlaing
|Tatmadaw
| 2 February 2021
|-
|Vice Chairman
|Soe Win
|Tatmadaw
| 2 February 2021
|-
|President
|Myint Swe
|Union Solidarity and Development Party
| 1 February 2021
|-
|}

The president is the head of state and de jure head of government, and oversees the Cabinet of Myanmar. Currently the Chairman of the State Administration Council is the de facto head of government.

The Commander-in-Chief of the Myanmar Defense Forces (Tatmadaw) has the right to appoint 25% of the members in all legislative assembly which means that legislations cannot obtain super-majority without support from Tatmadaw, thus preventing democratically elected members from amending the 2008 Constitution of Myanmar. He can also directly appoint ministers in Ministry of Defence (Myanmar) which in turn controls Myanmar Armed Forces, Ministry of Border Affairs (Myanmar) which controls border affairs of the country, Ministry of Home Affairs (Myanmar) which controls Myanmar police forces and the administration of the country and Myanmar Economic Corporation which is the largest economic corporation in Myanmar.

Legislative branch

Under the 2008 Constitution the legislative power of the Union is shared among the Pyidaungsu Hluttaw, State and Region Hluttaws. The Pyidaungsu Hluttaw consists of the People's Assembly (Pyithu Hluttaw) elected on the basis of township as well as population, and the House of Nationalities (Amyotha Hluttaw) with on an equal number of representatives elected from Regions and States. The People's Assembly consists of 440 representatives, with 110 being military personnel nominated by the Commander-in-Chief of the Defence Services. The House of Nationalities consists of 224 representatives with 56 being military personnel nominated by the Commander-in-Chief of the Defence Services.

Judicial system
Burma's judicial system is limited. British-era laws and legal systems remain much intact, but there is no guarantee of a fair public trial. The judiciary is not independent of the executive branch. Burma does not accept compulsory International Court of Justice jurisdiction. The highest court in the land is the Supreme Court. The Chief Justice of the Supreme Court is Htun Htun Oo, and the Attorney General is also named Thida Oo.

Wareru dhammathat
Wareru dhammathat or the Manu dhammathat was the earliest law-book in Burma. It consists of laws ascribed to the ancient Indian sage, Manu, and brought to Burma by Hindu colonists. The collection was made at Wareru’s command, by monks from the writings of earlier Mon scholars preserved in the monasteries of his kingdom. (Wareru seized Martaban in 1281 and obtained the recognition of China as the ruler of Lower Burma and founded a kingdom which lasted until 1539. Martaban was its first capital, and remained so until 1369. It stretched southwards as far as Tenasserim.)

Dhammazedi pyatton
Mon King Dhammazedi (1472–92) was the greatest of the Mon rulers of Wareru's line. He was famous for his wisdom and the collection of his rulings were recorded in the Kalyani stone inscriptions and known as the Dammazedi pyatton.

Administrative divisions

Burma is divided into seven regions (previously called divisions-taing) and seven states (pyi-nè), classified by ethnic composition. The seven regions are Ayeyarwady Region, Bago Division, Magway Division, Mandalay Division, Sagaing Division, Tanintharyi Division and Yangon Division; the seven states are Chin State, Kachin State, Kayin State, Kayah State, Mon State, Rakhine State and Shan State.
There are also five Self-administrated zones and a Self-administrated Division "for National races with suitable population"

Within the Sagain Region
 Naga (Leshi, Lahe and Namyun townships)
Within the Shan State
 Palaung (Namshan and Manton townships)
 Kokang (Konkyan and Laukkai townships)
 Pao (Hopong, Hshihseng and Pinlaung townships),
 Danu (Ywangan and Pindaya townships),
 Wa Selfadministrated division (Hopang, Mongmao, Panwai, Pangsang, Naphan and Metman townships)

International organisation participation

 Asian Development Bank
 Association of South East Asian Nations
 Chittagong City Corporation (CCC)
 Central Provinces (CP)
 ESCAP
 FAO
 G-77
 IAEA
 IBRD
 ICAO
 International Red Cross and Red Crescent Movement (ICRM)
 International Development Association (IDA)
 IFAD
 Irrawaddy Flotilla Company (IFC)
 IFRCS
 International Monetary Fund
 International Monetary Fund Organization (IMO) -see IMF
 Intelsat (nonsignatory user)
 Interpol
 International Olympic Committee
 ITU
 NAM
 OPCW
 United Nations
 UNCTAD
 UNDP
 UNESCO
 UNIDO
 UPU
 World Health Organization
 WMO
 WToO
 World Trade Organization
 Global Justice Center (GJC)

See also 
 United Nations Special Envoy on Myanmar

References

Further reading

 Kipgen, Nehginpao. "Democracy Movement in Myanmar: Problems and Challenges". New Delhi: Ruby Press & Co., 2014. Print.
 
 CIA World Factbook

 
Burma